CJBE-FM is a french language community radio station that operates at 90.5 FM in Port-Menier, Quebec, Canada. 

Owned by Radio Anticosti, the station received CRTC approval in 1988 to operate at 90.1 MHz, until it moved to its current frequency in 2006.

The station is a member of the Association des radiodiffuseurs communautaires du Québec.

References

External links
CJBE-FM history - Canadian Communication Foundation

Site Web officiel- Radio anticosti

Jbe
Jbe
Jbe
Radio stations established in 1988
1988 establishments in Quebec